Rossomyrmex proformicarum is a species of slave-making ant in the subfamily Formicinae. It is native to Russia.

References

External links 

Formicinae
Slave-making ants
Insects of Russia
Insects described in 1928
Taxonomy articles created by Polbot